Wang Yo may refer to:

 Wang Yo, the personal name of Jeongjong, 3rd monarch of Goryeo (923 – 949)
 Wang Yo, the personal name of  Gongyang of Goryeo (1345-1394)